Limitless is one of the world's largest private superyachts. It was built in 1997 by German shipmaker Lürssen, with exterior design by the noted Jon Bannenberg and collaborator Jonathan Quinn Barnett, and interior design by François Catroux. The overall length is 96.25 m (315 ft. 8 in.), the width 12.50 m (41 ft.). Limitless is owned by Les Wexner, an American businessman who is currently chairman and former CEO of the L Brands corporation (formerly Limited Brands, and best known for its brand Victoria's Secret).

References

External links
Lurssen.com

Ships built in Bremen (state)
1997 ships
Motor yachts
Les Wexner